PNS may refer to:

Medicine
 Peripheral nervous system
 Peripheral nerve stimulation of the occipital nerves
 Paraneoplastic syndrome
 Pilonidal sinus
 Posterior nasal spine, a cephalometric landmark

Transport
 Pensacola International Airport, IATA airport code
 Pensacola station (Amtrak), Amtrak station code

Technology
 Process network synthesis, a process engineering tool

Military
 Portsmouth Naval Shipyard, United States
 Pakistan Navy Ship

Science
 Post-normal science, approach to making policy with uncertain information

Other
 Pakistan Nuclear Society
 Program on Nonviolent Sanctions, at the Center for International Affairs at Harvard University, Cambridge, Massachusetts
 Public News Service, an American news media company